The 2015 Coppa Bernocchi was a one-day cycling semi-classic that took place on 17 September 2015, starting and finishing in Legnano in northern Italy. It was the second leg of the 2015 Trittico Lombardo and the 97th edition of the Coppa Bernocchi. The race was won by Vincenzo Nibali, who took a solo victory a second ahead of a small group. Mauro Finetto came second, with Matteo Trentin (riding for the Italian national team) third. Nibali had come second in the Coppa Ugo Agostoni and went on to win the Tre Valli Varesine to win the Trittico Lombardo competition.

Results

References 

Coppa Bernocchi
Coppa Bernocchi